Zirakpur is a satellite town, in Mohali District, Punjab, neighboring Mohali, Chandigarh in India. It is set on the foothills of Shivalik hills. It is part of the tehsil Dera Bassi. It is the gateway to Chandigarh from Delhi. It comprises mainly the following areas near Chandigarh Airport including VIP Road, Dhakoli, Lohgarh, Bhabat, Bishanpura, Kishanpura, Nabha, Gazipur, Baltana, Singhpura, Peer Muchalla and Dyalpura. This town is situated on the junction of national highways Himalayan Expressway, National Highway 5 (India) towards Shimla, Ambala Chandigarh Expressway towards Ambala and National Highway 7 (India) towards Patiala.

Areas nearby
 Dayalpura : The nearest area to the planned urban estate of Aerocity, IT city Mohali and Chandigarh International Airport. The 200 ft wide planned road through Dayalpura would connect Zirakpur directly to Besttech tower chauk in Mohali near Chandigarh border, shortening the distance of whole Zirakpur. There is a large chunk of shaamlat (Municipal council) land, where govt has planned a Govt Medical College & hospital like GMCH 32. A top-class stadium for special sportspersons, a police station, a fire station, startup incubation centre, and a big municipal park are also planned here because of the need and demand. A new high-end market with ample parking is going to come up on 82 ft wide that would connect 'High Ground Road' to Airport Road and Aerocity. The area is a leading destination in attracting real estate investments in Zirakpur. HighGround road is becoming the next VIP road.
Chhat: The Chhatbir Zoo (Mahinder Singh Zoological park) is famous all around northern India, and sees a large number of daily tourists.

Sectors in Zirakpur
Zirakpur has also been divided into 16 sectors. A sector map is yet to be put at different locations. It would be much help to people, but it would make it difficult to manipulate wards with gerrymandering during elections.

The colonies and villages falling in each sector are as under:
 Sector 12: Lohgarh, Balaji Enclave 2, Defence Colony, Sigma City.
 Sector 1: Harmilapnagar (phase -1)
Sector 9: Best Western Maryland, Best Price, Motiaz Royal Citi, Maya Garden Citi, The Decathlon
 Sector 16: Dayalpura
 VIP Road
 Bhabat / Pabhat
 Lohgarh
 Peer Muchalla
 Dhakoli 
 Baltana
 Nabha
 Gazipur
 Singhpura
 Bishanpura 
 Kishanpura

History
Zirakpur got its name from a small village, which is now a part of the present Zirakpur town. For long it remained a bunch of small villages located along the Chandigarh-Ambala highway. Then Chandigarh started to expand, and these villages started to seem like a part of Chandigarh. Before the year 2000, the city had a population of less than twenty thousand. Soon a small village Baltana, which is a part of Zirakpur now, started having some population growth being near Panchkula and Chandigarh. The upcoming 5500-acre GMADA Aerotropolis project near Dayalpura has increased the interest of investors in the region.

Municipal committee
Presently Zirakpur has a municipal committee. As the town has grown large with a considerable population, there is a demand that the town needs to have a municipal corporation.

Public transport and traffic

Zirakpur is well connected through air-conditioned and non-air-conditioned local buses with Chandigarh, Panchkula and other neighbouring areas. The inter-state buses going from Chandigarh to Delhi, Patiala, Rajpura, Bathinda and most of the northern cities of Haryana pass through Zirakpur. Zirakpur is located on the Ambala-Chandigarh highway and the Patiala-Shimla highway. The nearest railway station is Chandigarh, which is around 7 km from Zirakpur. The nearest airport is situated in Chandigarh at around 5 km from Zirakpur.

The Municipal authorities in Zirakpur have been under sharp criticism from the various resident associations of the area for not maintaining the roads and thereby leading to dangerous situations for the people commuting.

The process to divide Zirakpur into various sectors like Chandigarh has been initiated, as per the latest Municipal Council meeting. There has been a demand to name Zirakpur as "South Chandigarh", and sectors numbers starting from 201 onwards. This would give unique sector numbers to the whole Tricity, with Panchkula sector numbers starting from 301 and Mullanpur sector numbers starting from 401, thus making addresses short and removing confusion arising from the same sector numbers in adjoining towns.

Healthcare infrastructure
Zirakpur has several small and medium-sized hospitals catering to its primary health needs. Though it still lacks the presence of any big government hospital, relative to its population. Thus for better healthcare, a medical college & hospital is planned in Dayalpura. The one in Dhakoli is also being upgraded.

Sports
There's an SAI (Sports Authority of India) regional center  near Nabha Sahib. Upon completion it will cater to Himachal Pradesh, Jammu & Kashmir, Chandigarh and Punjab. The SAI center is spread across 15 acres and will have a football field, gymnasium hall, administrative block, indoor sports facilities and a six-lane athletics track. A big Sports Authority of India stadium for differently abled people is also coming up in Dayalpura  also so many private sports academies are available for various sports activities.

Temples and Gurudwaras

Vishwakarma Temple, Sanatan Dharam Mandir, Shiv Mandir-Green City

Gurudwara Bauli Sahib, Gurudwara Lohgarh Sahib, Gurudwara Naada Sahib, Gurudwara Nabha sahib, and Gurudwara Singpura sahidaa

Demographics
The Zirakpur Municipal Council has a population of 95,553 of which 50,497 are males while 45,056 are females as per a report released by Census India 2011. The population of children ages 0–6 is 12074 which is 12.64% of the total population of Zirakpur (M Cl). In Zirakpur Municipal Council, the Female Sex Ratio is 892 against the state average of 895. Moreover, the Child Sex Ratio in Zirakpur is around 855 compared to the Punjab state average of 846. The literacy rate of Zirakpur city is 88% higher than the state average of 75.84%. In Zirakpur, male literacy is around 91% while the female literacy rate is 85%.

Politics 
The town is organized into 31 wards which constitute the municipal council.

Gallery

See also
Greater Mohali

References

External links
Zirakpur Master Plan 2031
Zirakpur Map on GMADA Website
 GIS map of GMADA Zirakpur master plan. Can be zoomed unlimited to find exact details like the location of a master plan road in a khasra number etc.
 Official Municipal Council Website

Cities and towns in Sahibzada Ajit Singh Nagar district